Lick Creek is a stream in Miller County in the U.S. state of Missouri. It is a tributary of the Osage River.

Lick Creek was so named on account of mineral licks near its course which attracted deer.

See also
List of rivers of Missouri

References

Rivers of Miller County, Missouri
Rivers of Missouri